The Mercedes-Benz O405 was a single-decker bus manufactured by Mercedes-Benz from the mid-1980s to the early 2000s as either an integral bus or a bus chassis and was the last VöV SL-II standard bus in production. It was the replacement for the Mercedes-Benz O305 and was widely used in Europe, the United Kingdom, Australia and Singapore with 12,000 produced.

Standard floor version

The step-entrance version was known as the O405. A 3-axle articulated version was also built known as O405G and a trolleybus as the O405T. There were two generations of O405, designated as O405 MkI and O405 MkII. Most of them have their boxy roof dome (slightly arched) with a double-curvature windscreen, separately mounted destination indicator and pantograph system windshield wipers that was used on some buses such as the Dennis Dart, Leyland Lynx, MAN NL262 and the MAN SL202.

O405 Mark I
The O405 Mark I was marketed between mid-1980s and early 1990s. It was unveiled in September 1983. Optionally available was a naturally aspirated compressed natural gas (CNG) engine model M447hG with  output. The gearbox coupled to the engine was usually the Mercedes-Benz W3E110/2.2R or Mercedes-Benz W4E112/2.2R (the former being able to handle the more powerful 184 kW engine), although there have been other gearboxes such as the ZF 5HP 500 or Allison B300R coupled to the engine.

O405 Mark II
The O405 Mark II was marketed from the early 1990s to the late 1990s and into the early 2000s in some parts of the world. The gearbox coupled to the engine was either the ZF 4HP 500 or 5HP 500, or the Voith D864.3.

From 1994, this chassis was available with the M447hG Euro II  naturally aspirated compressed natural gas (CNG) engine.

Low-Floor Version: O405N

The low-floor version of the regular O405 was known as the O405N (or O405GN for the 3-axle articulated version) was released in September 1989, later a further developed version was also built, it was known as the O405N²/O405N2 (or O405GN²/O405GN2 for the 3-axle articulated version). The O405(G)N do not have steps at the entrances and exits, but the seats are mounted on "platforms". The GN2 type addressed this problem. These buses are usually fitted with ZF transmissions, but some are fitted with Voith examples. It has a boxy roof dome (slightly arched) similar to the MAN NL202 and the MAN NL262 with a double-curvature windscreen with a separately mounted destination display just that it has a full low floor layout with seats mounted on platforms.

Low-Entry Version: O405NH

The low-entry version of the O405 was called the O405NH chassis which was produced by EvoBus for the Australian market. Much of its popularity with government and private operators alike can be attributed to the popularity of the Mercedes-Benz O405 MkII chassis that it replaced.

The chassis was derived from a combination of the rear modules of an O405 MkII chassis and the front modules of an O405N²/O405GN² chassis. Because of the difference in height between the front and rear modules of the chassis, there are one or more steps leading up from behind the centre door position to a standard O405 floorline. Because the chassis has a horizontally-mounted engine, there's no room for a rear door. This low-entry concept has become very popular in Europe – many integral products using this concept have been released such as the Mercedes-Benz Citaro LE.

Suburban Version: O407

The suburban version was called O407 (or O407G/O405GÜ for the 3-axle articulated version), It had a single door at the front and a pair in the middle, with all of the seats facing towards the front of the bus. It featured a Mercedes Benz OM447h naturally aspirated engine with output  and 6-speed manual Mercedes-Benz gearbox.

Orders

Portugal

 Camo U1001S
 Camo Camus
 Irmãos Mota Atomic UR95 and UR2000
 Marcopolo Tricana bodies

In 1995, the first 6 O405 buses were delivered to Rodoviária de Lisboa (former Rodoviária Nacional) as the freights L-774 to L-779. More O405 buses were delivered between 1996 and 2003. The first 2 O405N were delivered in February 2003 as the freights L-533 and L-534, two months later as L-530, L-531, L-532 and L-535. The first O405N2 was delivered in July 2004 as the freight L-511. The first 2 O405G articulated buses were delivered in 2002, as more O405G buses were delivered in 2007 to replace the older Volvo B10MA buses. The first two UR95 O405 buses were delivered in 2004 which came from Vimeca Transportes as freights L-548 and L-549.

Many O405 buses were dropped and scrapped in 2013 to replace the O405N2 Camo Camus, originally from CCFL Carris between 2013 and 2014 and the second-hand Citaros in 2015-16. The only O405 still alive is the freight L-627, while the only O408 is the freight L-581. Some O405 buses changed the RL colors (Example: The O405N2 freight L-540 was originally a yellow RL color, now it changed to blue RL in 2020).

Spain
 Unicar
 Hispano Carrocera
 Castrosua
 Burillo

United Kingdom

A total of 365 O405s were built for operators in the United Kingdom, with Travel West Midlands purchasing 204. A sole O405Gs was bodied by Alexander for Grampian Regional Transport.

A total of 204 O405Ns were built for operators in the United Kingdom, with Travel West Midlands purchasing 193. A total of 15 O405GNs were built for operators in the United Kingdom, with Travel West Midlands purchasing 11.

Hong Kong

Discovery Bay Transit Services of Hong Kong acquired four O405 single-decker buses between 1995 and 1998, two were fitted with locally-built bodywork by Asia Auto Body Works and the other two had Hispano Carrocera bodywork.

Australia

Sydney Buses took delivery of 247 Pressed Metal Corporation bodied O405s between 1987 and October 1990. The last were retired in early 2016. In January 1997 it received two Ansair bodied O405Ns. It also inherited four Custom Coaches bodied O405s when it purchased North & Western Bus Lines. Between October 1999 and December 2001 it received 300 Custom Coaches bodied CNG O405NHs with the O405NH discontinued after this order.

The 300 Custom Coaches O405NH ordered by State Transit were delivered from Germany as a fully constructed frame and panels were fitted by Custom Coaches, so that as many of these buses could be on the road in time for the Sydney Olympic Games. They can seat 45 passengers and are 12.5 metres long. They have M447hG Euro 2 engines producing 175 kW.

In Western Australia, Transperth took delivery of their O405NHs between 1999 and 2003 with 48 natural gas and 349 diesel buses delivered including the six for Perth CAT services before being replaced by its successor, the OC500LE.

Other customers of the O405s included Busways, Quince's Scenicruisers and Westbus, Clarks Bus Service and Surfside Buslines.

Serbia 

In 2000, the city of Berlin donated Mercedes Benz O405, O405G and O405N. The O405G was scrapped in 2012, the O405N in 2017, and the O405 in 2019 along with the FAP A-537 bus that was on the same chassis.

Singapore

Singapore Bus Services ordered 700 Mercedes-Benz O405 to replace its first batch of Mercedes-Benz OF1413s between 1990 and 1992. They were bodied by Alexander PS and Duple Metsec (OAC (original air-con) and NAC (non-aircon)). The non air-con buses were later converted to air-con buses in 1998–99.

All were withdrawn from 1 March 2008 to 3 June 2011 with all replaced by Scania K230UB. A few O405s were shipped to Thailand and were rebodied whereas the rest of them were scrapped; one unit, SBS468K, was converted into a "Molly" mobile library registered as XD2037B by the National Library Board but has since been replaced by an ex-SBS Transit Volvo B10M in 2012.

Trans-Island Bus Services bought Mercedes-Benz O405 with Hispano Carrocera (both with and without air-con, although the latter was retrofitted with air-con later on) and Volgren CR221 bodies to replace the ageing Hino RK176, Nissan Diesel U31F and Hino HT228KA from 1994 to 1999. All Mercedes-Benz O405 with Hispano Carrocera bodywork had been retired by 25 September 2016. The Volgren-bodied O405s on the other hand were used as permanent training buses, only fully retiring by late February 2017. TIBS also procured various batches of bendy buses (Hispano Mark 1, Hispano Mark 2, Pininfarina-designed Hispano Habit and Volgren CR221) bodies between 1996 and 2004. All buses were retired on 1st December 2020, in line with LTA's directive of removing non-wheelchair accessible buses from revenue service.

Russia
 GolAZ (Golitsynskii avtobusnyi zavod) produced model O405 (АКА-5225) and O405G (АКА-6226)

Thailand

In 1993, BMTA Bought Mercedes Benz O405CNG about 38 buses. The O405CNG was scrapped in 20XX.

In 1995, BMTA Bought Mercedes Benz O405G about 52 buses. The O405G was scrapped in 20XX.

Bulgaria

Eridantrans EOOD bought many busses for the 260-line to Gorna Banya. They experienced hard turbulence on the Tsar Boris III avenue, but remained unbroken.

Replacement
Production of the Mercedes-Benz O405 ended in 2001 when the last articulated buses were delivered to Trans-Island Bus Services. The Mercedes-Benz O405 / O405N series was superseded by the Citaro, and the O405NH was superseded by the OC500LE.

References

External links

Articulated buses
Bus chassis
Buses of Germany
Low-entry buses
Low-floor buses
O405
Natural gas vehicles
Tri-axle buses
Vehicles introduced in 1983
Full-size buses